Shakir Pichler (born August, 1967 in Perth, Western Australia) is an Australian Drummer, Singer, and feature film Action Vehicle Coordinator.

Shakir joined his first performing rock band, the WAMI award-winning The Kryptonics in Perth, Western Australia in 1984 at the age of 17. They quickly attracted a record deal with Cherry Top and released their first single, Plastic Imitation / Baby (1985) and due to popular demand, soon after pressed a second batch which included the bonus track  "As Long As You're Mine".

Just after filming their first music video for "Baby," Shakir was poached by local hard rock band The Bamboos, with whom he recorded and released the single "Snuff", the flexi-disk "Dead Girl", the EP "Born Killer" and the album Rarer Than Rockinghorse Shit.

In 1991 he played drums with Nick Sheppard from The Clash in "The New Egyptian Kings".

After two national tours he finally left to form his own rockabilly band The Howlin MoonDoggies who have recorded three albums Doggie Style, Chasin Pussy & The Last Leg and have also been included on several international rockabilly compilations.

Having recorded two more music videos with The Howlin MoonDoggies in addition to managing the band, he decided to start his own record label in order to help other artists, SexBeat Records, which released a 28-band all Australian punk rock and ska compilation entitled Skunk & Disorderly (2000).
Moving from Perth to Sydney, New South Wales to be with his partner at the time Rebekah Elmaloglou he then formed a hard rock band called "Fink".

During the next few years he also worked in the film industry on many features such as Mission: Impossible 2 and On Our Selection and appeared in the feature film Fat Pizza (the movie) as well as various international commercials including work for Kahlúa and Claretine (USA).

In 2002 he moved from Sydney to Melbourne to work on the feature film Ghost Rider and the Stephen King series Nightmares & Dreamscapes and also formed a new band, Brutal Pancho, who in only one year made quite an impression on the international rock scene.

Briefly in 2007 he toured Australia with the Melbourne punk band Amphetish and with the American band The Wish You Weres.
He then lived in Barcelona for a year and helped promote local bands there while also working with Film company Icon International TV where he was flown around Europe as part of the Camera crew, filming Buena Vista Social Club live in Munich among many other productions.

In 2013 he played drums with 'The Terraces', based in Melbourne - a Punk/Rock band made up of well known musicians - Gary 'Gaz' Buckley from UK Punk band 'One Way System', Steve 'Kingy' King from 'Rose Tattoo', Dean Tslondres from 'Head Inc'. 
The Terraces released a music video of their version of the Clash's "Complete Control" as a tribute to Joe Strummer. This video also features special guest Nick Sheppard from The Clash! 
Source http://www.uberrock.co.uk/news-updates/97-july-news-updates/8670-the-terraces-release-complete-control-video-clip-featuring-the-clashs-nick-sheppard.html
They tour UK and Spain in August 2013.
A link to their video can be found here. The Terraces - Complete Control HD Video

Currently After living in Barcelona Spain for 5 years, he is now living in Western Australia again recording some new material with his Rockabilly band 'The Howlin MoonDoggies' in his home studio.

Since returning to Perth Western Australia, he has worked on 4 feature films as Action Vehicle Coordinator.
Jasper Jones
Hounds Of Love
Breath
1%
source IMDB https://www.imdb.com/name/nm7755135/

Discography

The Kryptonics
Plastic Imitation / Baby (1985)
Baby (Music Video)(1985)
Plastic Imitation / Baby / Bonus - As Long As You're Mine (1985)
Rejectionville (2007)

The Bamboos
Snuff / Virginia (1986)
Snuff (Music Video) (1986)
Rarer Than Rockinghorse Shit (1986)
Dead Girl - Flexidisk (1986)
Born Killer (1986)

The Howlin MoonDoggies
Doggie Style (1999)
Pistol Fast Cadillac (Music Video) (1999)
Chasin Pussy (2003)
Pieces (Music Video) (2003)
The Last Leg (2004)

FINK
Stupid Boy (2001)
Stupid Boy (Music Video) (2001)

Brutal Pancho
Rock Hard n Ready! (2006)
Lock n Load (2007)

The Terraces
Complete Control (Music Video) Featuring special guest Nick Sheppard from The Clash, Steve 'Kingy' King from Rose Tattoo (Sydney), Gary Buckley from One Way System (UK), Dean Tslondres from Head Inc (Melbourne)  (2013)

External links
Official Shakir Pichler web site
Official Shakir Pichler MySpace page

1967 births
Living people
Australian bandleaders
Australian rock singers
Australian rock drummers
Male drummers
Australian male singers
Australian songwriters
Australian rockabilly musicians
Musicians from Perth, Western Australia